Cheminformatics (also known as chemoinformatics) refers to use of physical chemistry theory with computer and information science techniques—so called "in silico" techniques—in application to a range of descriptive and prescriptive problems in the field of chemistry, including in its applications to biology and related molecular fields. Such in silico techniques are used, for example, by pharmaceutical companies and in academic settings to aid and inform the process of drug discovery, for instance in the design of well-defined combinatorial libraries of synthetic compounds, or to assist in structure-based drug design. The methods can also be used in chemical and allied industries, and such fields as environmental science and pharmacology, where chemical processes are involved or studied.

History 
Cheminformatics has been an active field in various guises since the 1970s and earlier, with activity in academic departments and commercial pharmaceutical research and development departments. The term chemoinformatics was defined in its application to drug discovery by F.K. Brown in 1998:Chemoinformatics is the mixing of those information resources to transform data into information and information into knowledge for the intended purpose of making better decisions faster in the area of drug lead identification and optimization. Since then, both terms, cheminformatics and chemoinformatics, have been used, although, lexicographically, cheminformatics appears to be more frequently used, despite academics in Europe declaring for the variant chemoinformatics in 2006. In 2009, a prominent Springer journal in the field was founded by transatlantic executive editors named the Journal of Cheminformatics.

Background 
Cheminformatics combines the scientific working fields of chemistry, computer science, and information science—for example in the areas of topology, chemical graph theory, information retrieval and data mining in the chemical space. Cheminformatics can also be applied to data analysis for various industries like paper and pulp, dyes and such allied industries.

Applications

Storage and retrieval

A primary application of cheminformatics is the storage, indexing, and search of information relating to chemical compounds. The efficient search of such stored information includes topics that are dealt with in computer science, such as data mining, information retrieval, information extraction, and machine learning. Related research topics include:

 Digital libraries
 Unstructured data
 Structured data mining and mining of structured data
Database mining
Graph mining
Molecule mining
Sequence mining
Tree mining

File formats 

The in silico representation of chemical structures uses specialized formats such as the Simplified molecular input line entry specifications (SMILES) or the XML-based Chemical Markup Language.  These representations are often used for storage in large chemical databases. While some formats are suited for visual representations in two- or three-dimensions, others are more suited for studying physical interactions, modeling and docking studies.

Virtual libraries 

Chemical data can pertain to real or virtual molecules.  Virtual libraries of compounds may be generated in various ways to explore chemical space and hypothesize novel compounds with desired properties. Virtual libraries of classes of compounds (drugs, natural products, diversity-oriented synthetic products) were recently generated using the FOG (fragment optimized growth) algorithm.  This was done by using cheminformatic tools to train transition probabilities of a Markov chain on authentic classes of compounds, and then using the Markov chain to generate novel compounds that were similar to the training database.

Virtual screening 

In contrast to high-throughput screening, virtual screening involves computationally
screening in silico libraries of compounds, by means of various methods such as
docking, to identify members likely to possess desired properties
such as biological activity against a given target. In some cases, combinatorial chemistry is used in the development of the library to increase the efficiency in mining the chemical space. More commonly, a diverse library of small molecules or natural products is screened.

Quantitative structure-activity relationship (QSAR)

This is the calculation of quantitative structure–activity relationship and quantitative structure property relationship values, used to predict the activity of compounds from their structures. In this context there is also a strong relationship to chemometrics. Chemical expert systems are also relevant, since they represent parts of chemical knowledge as an in silico representation. There is a relatively new concept of matched molecular pair analysis or prediction-driven MMPA which is coupled with QSAR model in order to identify activity cliff.

See also 

 Bioinformatics
 Chemical file format
 Chemicalize.org
 Cheminformatics toolkits
 Chemogenomics
 Computational chemistry
 Information engineering
 Journal of Chemical Information and Modeling
 Journal of Cheminformatics
 Materials informatics
 Molecular Conceptor
 Molecular design software
 Molecular graphics
 Molecular Informatics
 Molecular modelling
 Nanoinformatics
 Software for molecular modeling
 WorldWide Molecular Matrix
 Molecular descriptor

References

Further reading

External links 

 

 
Computational chemistry
Drug discovery
Computational fields of study
Applied statistics